Guanmiao District is a rural district in southeastern Tainan, Taiwan.

History
After the handover of Taiwan from Japan to the Republic of China in 1945, Guanmiao was organized as a rural township of Tainan County. On 25 December 2010, Tainan County was merged with Tainan City and Guanmiao was upgraded to a district of the city.

Geography 
 Area: 53.64 km2
 Population: 33,436 people (January 2023)

Administrative divisions 
The district consists of Guanmiao, Shanxi, Xiangyang, Beishi, Xinpu, Xinguang, Wujia, Tungshi, Songjiao, Shenkeng, Budai, Beitou, Xiahu, Huayuan and Nanxiong Village.

Tourist attractions 

 Datan Lake Wanglai Park
 Fang Family Shrine
 Guanmiao Forest Park
 Guanmiao Shansi Temple
 Hills of Seven Constellations
 Sinfeng Church
 Thousand-Buddha Bodhi Temple
 Tiesian Bridge
 Yu Zen Retirement Center

Transportation 
Guanmiao Service Area and an interchange of the Formosa Freeway is located in here.

Notable natives 
 Kuo Kuo-wen, Deputy Minister of Labor (2016–2017)
 Chien-Ming Wang, MLB Pitcher(2000-2016)

References

External links 

 

Districts of Tainan